The list of ship decommissionings in 2015 includes a chronological list of ships decommissioned in 2015.

References

2015
 
Ships